Yocoboué (also spelled Yokoboué) is a town in southern Ivory Coast. It is a sub-prefecture of Guitry Department in Lôh-Djiboua Region, Gôh-Djiboua District. It is located in the southeastern corner of Gôh-Djiboua District near the border with Lagunes District.

In 2014, the population of the sub-prefecture of Yocoboué was 22,760.

Villages
The 14 villages of the sub-prefecture of Yocoboué and their population in 2014 are:

References

Sub-prefectures of Lôh-Djiboua
Former communes of Ivory Coast